Morărești is a commune in Argeș County, Muntenia, Romania. It is composed of six villages: Dedulești, Dealu Obejdeanului, Luminile, Măncioiu, Morărești and Săpunar.

References

Communes in Argeș County
Localities in Muntenia